Al Garum Islands are the northernmost group of islands of Bahrain.

Geography
There are 4 islands in this reef, and a curved channel was dredged to reach the main island.

Administration
The island belongs to Northern Governorate.

Transportation
The island might be the location of a new Army airfield.

Flora and fauna
The island is known for its rich fish life.

Image gallery

References 

Islands of Bahrain